Lockdown all'italiana is a 2020 Italian comedy film directed by Enrico Vanzina.

Cast
Ezio Greggio as Giovanni
Ricky Memphis as Walter
Paola Minaccioni as Mariella
Martina Stella as Tamara
Marialuisa Jacobelli as Monica
Romina Pierdomenico as Bianca
Riccardo Rossi as Alberto Persichetti
Biagio Izzo as Lepore
Maurizio Mattioli as Marione
Fabrizio Bracconeri
Gaia Insenga as Veronica
Enzo Salvi as Paolo (voice)
Giuseppe Casteltrione as Gaetano

References

External links

2020 films
2020s Italian-language films
2020 comedy films
Italian comedy films
Films about the COVID-19 pandemic
2020s Italian films